John Jackson (born 13 February 1964) is a Scottish professional stock car racing driver. He last competed part-time in the NASCAR Xfinity Series, driving the No. 66 Toyota Camry for MBM Motorsports. He has also competed in other series, most notably the NASCAR Camping World Truck Series and the ARCA Racing Series.

Racing career

ARCA Racing Series
Jackson made his ARCA debut at the 2006 Pocono 200 driving for Mario Gosselin.  He started 22nd, but crashed and finished 30th.  Jackson failed to qualify for two other ARCA races that season.  His first start in 2007 came in the Construct Corps-Palm Beach Grading 250 at USA International Speedway, where he posted his best finish in ARCA, an eighth.  Jackson made two more starts and failed to qualify for a race, posting a 34th at Kansas Speedway after a crash and a 20th at Chicagoland Speedway.  He made one start in 2008, at Talladega Superspeedway.  He finished 25th after a crash but led that number of laps. All five of his ARCA starts were for Gosselin.

NASCAR Camping World Truck Series
Jackson made his Truck debut in 2009 driving for Gosselin.  He made five starts in the No. 72 Chevrolet Silverado, and one start in the No. 92.  He also failed to qualify for two races in the 92.  His best finish was a 28th at Texas Motor Speedway, and he did not finish a race running as a start and park team. In 2010, he started four races, with a best finish of 27th at Kentucky Speedway. That was the only race he finished, starting and parking at Darlington Raceway and Talladega, and crashing at Homestead-Miami Speedway.  He also failed to qualify for one race with Dwayne Tatman.

NASCAR Xfinity Series

In 2011, he ran four races for James Carter, recording a best finish of 31st at Atlanta in the only race that he did not start and park. He also failed to qualify for two races. In 2012, he started and parked for two races, and failed to qualify for three more. In 2014, he ran three races for Carter and one for Jimmy Means. He also failed to qualify with three with Carter. His last race with Carter, at Richmond International Raceway, remains the last Xfinity start with No. 72 as of May 2016. In 2015, he ran a career-high five races, four with MBM Motorsports and one for Means. Again, he start-and-parked for all but one race, recording a 31st at Iowa Speedway with MBM.  The race with Means remains the last Xfinity race run with No. 79 as of May 2016. In 2016, he made his debut at Talladega. Jackson ran six more races for MBM, becoming the first Scottish driver to finish last in an Xfinity race. The Talladega race is one of three races Jackson has finished in his Xfinity career. Jackson returned to MBM for one race in each of the team's three cars in 2017, failing to finish all three. He was also pulled off entry lists twice in the No. 72 machine.

Motorsports career results

NASCAR
(key) (Bold – Pole position awarded by qualifying time. Italics – Pole position earned by points standings or practice time. * – Most laps led.)

Xfinity Series

Camping World Truck Series

 Season still in progress
 Ineligible for series points

ARCA Re/Max Series
(key) (Bold – Pole position awarded by qualifying time. Italics – Pole position earned by points standings or practice time. * – Most laps led.)

References

External links
 
 

Living people
1964 births
People from Carluke
NASCAR drivers
NASCAR crew chiefs
ARCA Menards Series drivers
Scottish emigrants to the United States
Scottish racing drivers